Alicia Molik was the defending champion, but retired in the first round against Jelena Janković.

Lindsay Davenport won the title, defeating Patty Schnyder 7–6(7–5), 6–3 in the final.

Seeds

Draw

Finals

Top half

Bottom half

External links
WTA draws

Singles
Zurich Open